The 1986–87 Bradley Braves men's basketball team represented Bradley University during the 1986–87 NCAA Division I men's basketball season. The Braves were members of the Missouri Valley Conference (MVC) and played their home games at Carver Arena. Following the departure of former head coach Dick Versace, Bradley was banned from postseason play. The Braves were led by first year head coach Stan Albeck and AP Honorable mention All-American Hersey Hawkins, who averaged 27.2 points per game.

Roster

Schedule

|-
!colspan=12 style=| Regular season

Awards and honors
Hersey Hawkins – MVC Player of the Year

References

Bradley Braves men's basketball seasons
Bradley
Bradley Braves men's basketball
Bradley Braves men's basketball